Lakepa is one of the fourteen villages of Niue. Its population at the 2017 census was 87, up from 70 in 2011.

References

Populated places in Niue